Ryd, or RYD, may refer to:

 Ryd, Linköping, a residential area in Linköping, Sweden
 Ryd, Tingsryd Municipality, Sweden
 Elize Ryd, Swedish singer-songwriter
 Ryd Abbey, a former monastery in Schleswig-Holstein, Germany
 Ryd, an abbreviation used when stating physical quantities in Rydberg atomic units, a type of atomic unit 
 RYD, the National Rail code for Ryde Esplanade railway station on the Isle of Wight, UK
 Return YouTube Dislike, a 2021 web browser extension

See also
 
 
 Ryde (disambiguation)
 Ryder (disambiguation)